Charles Philip Leese (22 May 1889 – 19 January 1947) was an English cricketer active from 1908 to 1911 who played for Lancashire. He was born in Manchester and died in Shropshire. He appeared in 16 first-class matches as a righthanded batsman, scoring 341 runs with a highest score of 48 and held five catches.

Leese married Ethel Speakman, but they divorced, and she later married architect Maxwell Fry.

Notes

1889 births
1947 deaths
English cricketers
Lancashire cricketers
Marylebone Cricket Club cricketers
Oxford University cricketers
Cricketers from Manchester
Alumni of Oriel College, Oxford